Haraguchi (written: 原口 lit. "field mouth") is a Japanese surname. Notable people with the surname include:

, Japanese engineer known for memorizing and reciting Pi digits
, Japanese footballer
, Japanese politician
, Japanese diplomat
, Japanese sprinter
Haragouchi Japanese drifter

See also
17933 Haraguchi, a main-belt asteroid

Japanese-language surnames